

Deaths in August

1: Eric Tindill
10: Antonio Pettigrew
16: Bobby Thomson
22: Stjepan Bobek
27: Anton Geesink
30: Francisco Varallo
31: Laurent Fignon

Current sporting seasons

Australian rules football 2010
Australian Football League

Auto racing 2010
Formula One
Sprint Cup
IRL IndyCar Series
World Rally Championship
Formula Two
Nationwide Series
Camping World Truck Series
GP2 Series
GP3 Series
WTTC
V8 Supercar
American Le Mans
Le Mans Series
Superleague Formula
Rolex Sports Car Series
FIA GT1 World Championship
Formula Three
Auto GP
World Series by Renault
Deutsche Tourenwagen Masters
Super GT

Baseball 2010
Major League Baseball
Nippon Professional Baseball

Basketball 2010
WNBA Playoffs
Philippines collegiate:
NCAA
UAAP

Canadian football 2010
Canadian Football League

Cricket 2010
England:
County Championship
Clydesdale Bank 40
Friends Provident t20

Football (soccer) 2010
National teams competitions
UEFA Euro 2012 qualifying
2011 FIFA Women's World Cup qualification (UEFA)
2011 UEFA European Under-21 Championship qualification
International clubs competitions
UEFA (Europe) Champions League
Europa League
UEFA Women's Champions League
Copa Sudamericana
AFC (Asia) Champions League
AFC Cup
CAF (Africa) Champions League
CAF Confederation Cup
CONCACAF (North & Central America) Champions League
Domestic (national) competitions
Argentina
Australia
Brazil
England
France
Germany
Iran
Italy
Japan
Norway
Russia
Scotland
Spain
Major League Soccer (USA & Canada)
Women's Professional Soccer (USA)

Golf 2010
PGA Tour
European Tour
LPGA Tour
Champions Tour

Lacrosse 2010
Major League Lacrosse

Motorcycle racing 2010
Moto GP
Superbike World Championship
Supersport racing

Rugby league 2010
Super League
NRL

Rugby union 2010
2011 Rugby World Cup qualifying
Top 14
Currie Cup
ITM Cup

Snooker
Players Tour Championship

August 31, 2010 (Tuesday)

Water polo
Women's European Championship in Zagreb, Croatia:
Group A:
 3–28 
 7–5 
Group B:
 12–10 
 8–9

Badminton
BWF World Championships in France.

August 30, 2010 (Monday)

Tennis
Grand Slams US Open in New York City, United States starts.

Water polo
Men's European Championship in Zagreb, Croatia:
Group A:
 10–11 
 11–10 
 16–3 
Standings (after 2 games): Romania, Italy 6 points, Croatia, Montenegro 3, Spain, Turkey 0.
Group B:
 7–6 
 6–9 
 10–5 
Standings (after 2 games): Hungary 6 points, Serbia, Germany, Greece, Macedonia 3, Russia 0.

Cricket
Pakistan in England 4th Test in London, day 4 England win by an innings and 225 runs; win 4-match series 3–1.

August 29, 2010 (Sunday)
EuroBasket 2011 qualification conclusion.

Field hockey
Women's World Cup in Rosario, Argentina starts.

Auto racing
Formula One Belgian Grand Prix in Spa, Belgium: (1) Lewis Hamilton  (McLaren-Mercedes)
Nationwide Series NAPA Auto Parts 200 in Montreal, Canada: (1) Boris Said (Ford

Motorcycle racing
Moto GP:
Indianapolis motorcycle Grand Prix in Speedway, Indiana, United States:
MotoGP: (1) Dani Pedrosa  (Honda)
Moto2: (1) Toni Elías  (Moriwaki)
125cc: (1) Nicolás Terol  (Aprilia)

Volleyball
FIVB World Grand Prix Final Round in Ningbo, China concludes. The United States win the title for the third time.

Water polo
Men's European Championship in Zagreb, Croatia:
Group A:
 6–12 
 7–6 
 11–9 
Group B:
 9–10 
 10–8 
 13–5

Golf
PGA Tour:
FedEx Cup Playoffs:
The Barclays in Paramus, New Jersey:
Winner: Matt Kuchar  272 (-12)PO
Kuchar wins his third PGA Tour title.
European Tour:
Johnnie Walker Championship at Gleneagles in Auchterarder, Scotland:
Winner: Edoardo Molinari  278 (-10)
Molinari wins his second European Tour title, and is later announced as one of three wildcard picks for the European team for October's Ryder Cup along with Luke Donald  and Pádraig Harrington .
LPGA Tour:
CN Canadian Women's Open in Winnipeg:
Winner: Michelle Wie  276 (-12)
Wie wins her second LPGA Tour title.
Champions Tour:
Boeing Classic in Snoqualmie, Washington:
Winner: Bernhard Langer  198 (-18)
Langer wins his fifth Champions Tour title of the season and thirteenth overall.
Amateur events:
U.S. Amateur Championship in University Place, Washington:
Final: Peter Uihlein  def. David Chung  4 & 2
Uihlein wins his third major amateur title, as both players earn a place at the 2011 Masters Tournament.

Snooker
Players Tour Championship:
Euro Event 1 in Fürth, Germany. Judd Trump wins his third professional title.

August 28, 2010 (Saturday)

Basketball
FIBA World Championship in Turkey begins.

Cycling
Grand Tours:
Vuelta a España Starts.

Tennis
ATP World Tour Pilot Pen Tennis Sergiy Stakhovsky won the fourth title of his career.
WTA Tour Pilot Pen Tennis Caroline Wozniacki won the title for the third consecutive time, her fourth of the year and tenth of her career.

Auto racing
IndyCar Series Peak Antifreeze & Motor Oil Indy 300 in Joliet, Illinois: (1) Dario Franchitti  (Chip Ganassi Racing)

Mixed martial arts
UFC 118 in Boston, Massachusetts

Equestrianism
Show jumping:
Global Champions Tour 9th Competition in Rio de Janeiro (CSI 5*). Marcus Ehning  on Noltes Küchengirl wins the title for the first time.

Figure skating
ISU Junior Grand Prix in Courchevel, France.

Cricket
Tri-nation series in Sri Lanka, Final in Dambulla concludes. Sri Lanka win by 74 runs.

August 27, 2010 (Friday)

Football (soccer)
UEFA Super Cup in Monaco Atlético Madrid Atlético won the title for the first time.

Athletics
IAAF Diamond League: Memorial Van Damme in Brussels, Belgium

August 26, 2010 (Thursday)
Summer Youth Olympics in Singapore Closes

August 25, 2010 (Wednesday)

Cricket
Tri-nation series in Sri Lanka: (teams in bold advance to the final) 223 (46.3 overs; Virender Sehwag 110);  118 (30.1 overs) in Dambulla. India win by 105 runs.Final standings:  11 points, India 10, New Zealand 7.

August 24, 2010 (Tuesday)

Cycling
UCI ProTour:
Eneco Tour of Benelux concludes.
Final general classification: (1) Martin 25px 28h 50' 57" (2) Koos Moerenhout  + 31" (3) Edvald Boasson Hagen   + 1' 46"

Cricket
Tri-nation series in Sri Lanka: (team in bold advances to the final)
 103 (33.4 overs; Thissara Perera 5/28);  104/2 (15.1 overs) in Dambulla. Sri Lanka win by 8 wickets.Standings: Sri Lanka 11 points (4 matches),  7 (3), India 5 (3).

August 23, 2010 (Monday)

Cricket
Pakistan in England 3rd Test in London, day 4 Pakistan win by 4 wickets; England lead 4-match series 2–1.August 22, 2010 (Sunday)

Basketball
FIBA Europe Under-16 Championship for Women in Greece concludes.
Russia won the title for the fourth time.

Tennis
ATP World Tour Western & Southern Financial Group Masters Roger Federer won his second title of the year, 17th Masters 1000 title and 63rd title of his career. He wins this event for the fourth time, also winning in 2005, 2007, and 2009.

Auto racing
IndyCar Series Indy Grand Prix of Sonoma in Sonoma, California: (1) Will Power  (Team Penske)
World Rally Championship Rallye Deutschland in Trier: (1) Sébastien Loeb  / Daniel Elena  (Citroën C4 WRC)

Water polo
FINA Women's World Cup in Christchurch, New Zealand The United States win the Cup for the second time.

Canoeing
Sprint World Championships in Poznan, Poland.

Swimming
Pan Pacific Championships in Irvine, California concludes.

Athletics
David Rudisha  breaks the men's 800 metres world record in a time of one minute 41.09 seconds at the ISTAF meeting in Berlin. He improves the previous record of Kenyan-born Wilson Kipketer  by 0.02 seconds.

Golf
Senior majors:
JELD-WEN Tradition in Sunriver, Oregon, United States : (1) Fred Funk 276 (-12)
Funk wins his second Tradition and third senior major.
PGA Tour:
Wyndham Championship in Greensboro, North Carolina:
Winner: Arjun Atwal  260 (-20)
Atwal becomes the first Indian-born player to win a PGA Tour event, and the first Monday qualifier to win on the tour since 1986.
European Tour:
Czech Open in Celadná, Czech Republic:
Winner: Peter Hanson  278 (-10)PO
Hanson wins a three-way playoff for his second European Tour title of the season and fourth of his career.
LPGA Tour:
Safeway Classic in North Plains, Oregon:
Winner: Ai Miyazato  205 (-11)
Miyazato wins her fifth LPGA event of the year and sixth of her career, and for the third time this year claims the Number 1 spot in the Women's World Golf Rankings.

August 21, 2010 (Saturday)

Auto racing
NASCAR Sprint Cup Series Irwin Tools Night Race in Bristol, Tennessee: (1)  Kyle Busch (Toyota; Joe Gibbs Racing)
Busch completes a clean sweep of all three national series races (Sprint Cup, Nationwide and Camping World Trucks) in the same weekend, the first driver to do so.

Rugby union
Tri Nations Series:
 22–29  in Soweto
The All Blacks score two tries in the last 3 minutes to secure the series crown, their tenth overall.

August 20, 2010 (Friday)

Auto racing
Nationwide Series Food City 250 in Bristol, Tennessee: (1)  Kyle Busch (Toyota; Joe Gibbs Racing)

August 19, 2010 (Thursday)

Baseball
U.S. federal authorities indict retired seven-time Cy Young Award winner Roger Clemens on charges of making false statements to Congress about his alleged use of performance-enhancing drugs. (The New York Times)

Athletics
IAAF Diamond League: Weltklasse Zürich in Zürich, Switzerland.

August 18, 2010 (Wednesday)
Pan Pacific Championships in Irvine, California starts.

Cricket
Netherlands in Ireland 2nd ODI in Dublin. Ireland win by 9 wickets; win 2-match series 2–0.August 17, 2010 (Tuesday)

Cycling
UCI ProTour Eneco Tour of Benelux Starts.

Cricket
Afghanistan in Scotland 2nd ODI in Ayr. Scotland win by 6 wickets; 2-match series drawn 1–1.August 16, 2010 (Monday)

Cycling
UCI ProTour
Vattenfall Cyclassics in Hamburg, Germany:  Tyler Farrar  5h 02' 36"  Edvald Boasson Hagen  s.t.  André Greipel  s.t.

Snooker
Players Tour Championship:
Event 4 in Sheffield Barry Pinches wins the second professional title of his career.

Cricket
Afghanistan in Scotland 1st ODI in Ayr. Afghanistan win by 9 wickets; lead 2-match series 1–0.Netherlands in Ireland 1st ODI in Dublin. Ireland win by 70 runs; lead 2-match series 1–0.August 15, 2010 (Sunday)

Basketball
FIBA Asia Stanković Cup concludes: Lebanon win the Cup for the first time.
FIBA Europe Under-16 Championship in Bar, Montenegro concludes: Croatia win the title for the second time.

Tennis
ATP World Tour Rogers Masters in Toronto, Canada Andy Murray defends his title, and wins the 15th title of his career.
WTA Tour Western & Southern Financial Group Women's Open in Mason, Ohio, United States Kim Clijsters won the 38th title of her career.

Auto racing
NASCAR Sprint Cup Series:
Carfax 400 in Brooklyn, Michigan: (1) Kevin Harvick (Chevrolet; Richard Childress Racing)

Motorcycle racing
Moto GP:
Czech Republic motorcycle Grand Prix in Brno, Czech Republic:
MotoGP: (1) Jorge Lorenzo  (Yamaha)
Moto2: (1) Toni Elías  (Moriwaki)
125cc: (1) Nicolás Terol  (Aprilia)

Horse racing
Canadian Triple Crown Breeders' Stakes in Toronto: (1) Miami Deco (trainer: Brian Lynch, jockey: Richard Dos Ramos)

Swimming
European Aquatics Championships in Budapest, Hungary Concludes.

Golf
Men's majors:
PGA Championship in Haven, Wisconsin, United States  won by Martin Kaymer 
Kaymer becomes the second German winner of a major championship, after Bernhard Langer.
Dustin Johnson misses out on the playoff when he is ruled to have grounded his club in a bunker on the final hole, incurring a two-stroke penalty.

August 14, 2010 (Saturday)

Basketball
FIBA South American Championship for Women in Santiago, Chile concludes: Brazil win the title for the tenth successive time, and 23rd time overall.

Auto racing
Nationwide Series:
CARFAX 250 in Brooklyn, Michigan: (1)  Brad Keselowski (Dodge; Penske Racing)

Equestrianism
Show jumping:
Global Champions Tour 8th Competition in Valkenswaard (CSI 5*) won by Laura Kraut  on Cedric

Athletics
IAAF Diamond League: London Grand Prix in London, United Kingdom.

August 12, 2010 (Thursday)

Basketball
FIBA Europe Under-16 Championship for Women in Greece begins.

Handball
World Youth Women's Handball Championship in the Dominican Republic Sweden win the title for the first time.
Summer Youth Olympics in Singapore Opens

August 10, 2010 (Tuesday)

Football (soccer)
Friendly international matches:
 0–1 
 0–2 

Shooting
ISSF World Championships in Munich, Germany concludes.

Cricket
Tri-nation series in Sri Lanka starts.

August 9, 2010 (Monday)

Cricket
Pakistan in England 2nd Test in Birmingham, day 4. England win by 9 wickets; lead 4-match series 2–0.August 8, 2010 (Sunday)

Basketball
FIBA Europe Under-18 Championship for Women in Slovakia concludes: Italy win the title for the second time, repeating their 1994 final victory over Spain.

Field hockey
Men's Hockey Champions Trophy in Mönchengladbach, Germany concludes. Australia won the title for the third successive year, and eleventh time overall.

Tennis
ATP World Tour Legg Mason Tennis Classic in Washington, D.C., United States David Nalbandian Nalbandian won his first title of the year and eleventh of his career.
WTA Tour Mercury Insurance Open in San Diego, United States Svetlana Kuznetsova Kuznetsova won the thirteenth title of her career.
WTA Tour e-Boks Danish Open in Farum Caroline Wozniacki Wozniacki won the inaugural event and the eighth title of her career.

Auto racing
NASCAR Sprint Cup Series Heluva Good! Sour Cream Dips at the Glen in Watkins Glen, New York: (1)  Juan Pablo Montoya (Chevrolet; Earnhardt Ganassi Racing)
IndyCar Series Honda Indy 200 in Lexington, Ohio: (1) Dario Franchitti  (Chip Ganassi Racing)

Equestrianism
Show jumping:
FEI World Cup Jumping – Central European League, South Sub-League won by Tim Hoster  on Rastellie
Grand Prix of Ireland in Dublin (CSIO 5*) won by McLain Ward  on Antares F

Golf
World Golf Championships:
WGC-Bridgestone Invitational in Akron, Ohio, United States:
Winner: Hunter Mahan  268 (-12)
Mahan wins his third PGA Tour title, and barring injury, seals a place in the American team for the Ryder Cup in October.
PGA Tour:
Turning Stone Resort Championship in Verona, New York:
Winner: Bill Lunde  271 (-17)
Lunde wins his first PGA Tour title.
Champions Tour:
3M Championship in Blaine, Minnesota:
Winner: David Frost  191 (-25)
Frost wins his first Champions Tour title.

Snooker
Players Tour Championship:
Event 3 in Sheffield:
Final: Tom Ford  def. Jack Lisowski  4–0
Ford wins his first professional title.
Order of Merit (after 3 of 12 events): (1) Mark Selby  13,100 (2) Ford 12,100 (3) Mark Williams  10,200

August 7, 2010 (Saturday)

Cycling
UCI ProTour:
Tour de Pologne concludes
Final general classification: (1) Dan Martin   30h 38' 48" (2) Grega Bole  + 8" (3) Bauke Mollema  + 10"

Auto racing
Nationwide Series:
Zippo 200 at the Glen in Watkins Glen, New York: (1)  Marcos Ambrose (Toyota; JTG Daugherty Racing) (2)  Joey Logano (Toyota; Joe Gibbs Racing) (3)  Kevin Harvick (Chevrolet; Kevin Harvick Inc.)
Drivers' championship standings (after 22 of 35 races): (1)  Brad Keselowski (Dodge; Penske Racing) 3509 points (2)  Carl Edwards (Ford; Roush Fenway Racing) 3182 (3)  Kyle Busch (Toyota; Joe Gibbs Racing) 3036

Volleyball
Asian Men's Cup Championship in Urmia, Iran Iran win the title for the second time.

Mixed martial arts
UFC 117 in Oakland, California:

Equestrianism
Show jumping:
Puissance in Dublin (CSIO 5*) won by Pablo Barrios  on Sinatra

Cricket
India in Sri Lanka 3rd Test in Colombo, day 5. India win by 5 wickets; 3-match series drawn 1–1.August 6, 2010 (Friday)

Equestrianism
Show jumping:
Meydan FEI Nations Cup 8th competition: FEI Nations Cup of Ireland in Dublin (CSIO 5*) won by (Eric van der Vleuten on Utascha SFN

Athletics
IAAF Diamond League: DN Galan in Stockholm, Sweden.

August 4, 2010 (Wednesday)
European Aquatics Championships in Budapest, Hungary Starts.

August 3, 2010 (Tuesday)

Cricket
India's Sachin Tendulkar becomes the most capped player in Test cricket, receiving his 169th cap to surpass Steve Waugh.

August 2, 2010 (Monday)

Basketball
EuroBasket 2011 qualification starts.

August 1, 2010 (Sunday)

Cycling
UCI ProTour Tour de Pologne starts.

Tennis
ATP World Tour Allianz Suisse Open Gstaad in Gstaad, Switzerland Nicolás Almagro Almagro won the seventh title of his career.
ATP World Tour ATP Studena Croatia Open Umag in Umag, Croatia Juan Carlos Ferrero won the 15th title of his career.
ATP World Tour Farmers Classic in Los Angeles, California, United States Sam Querrey Querrey defends his title, and wins the sixth title of his career.
Doubles: Bob and Mike Bryan'  win their 62nd career ATP Tour title, breaking the record previously set by The Woodies (Australians Todd Woodbridge and Mark Woodforde).
WTA Tour Istanbul Cup in Istanbul, Turkey Anastasia Pavlyuchenkova wins the second title of her career.
WTA Tour Bank of the West Classic in Stanford, California, United States Victoria Azarenka wins the fourth title of her career.

Auto racing
Formula One Hungarian Grand Prix in Mogyoród, Hungary: (1) Mark Webber  (Red Bull-Renault)
NASCAR Sprint Cup Series Sunoco Red Cross Pennsylvania 500 in Long Pond, Pennsylvania: (1) Greg Biffle (Ford; Roush Fenway Racing)
World Touring Car Championship:
Race of the Czech Republic:
Round 13: (1) Robert Huff  (Chevrolet; Chevrolet Cruze)
Round 14: (1) Andy Priaulx  (BMW Team RBM; BMW 320si)

Motorcycle racing
Superbike:
Silverstone Superbike World Championship round in Northamptonshire, United Kingdom:
Race 1: (1) Cal Crutchlow  (Yamaha YZF-R1)
Race 2: (1) Crutchlow
Supersport:
Silverstone Supersport World Championship round in Northamptonshire, United Kingdom: (1) Eugene Laverty  (Honda CBR600RR)

Baseball
European Championship in Germany:
Final Italy win the title for the ninth time and stop the Netherlands' winning streak at five.

Equestrianism
Dressage:
World Dressage Masters:
3rd Competition: CDI 5*Royal International Horse Show at Hickstead:
B-Final (Grand Prix Spécial): won by Carl Hester  on Liebling IIA-Final (Grand Prix Freestyle):  Adelinde Cornelissen  on ParzivalShow jumping:
King Georges V Gold Cup at Hickstead (CSIO 5*):  Tim Stockdale  on Kalico Bay''

Water polo
FINA Men's World Cup in Oradea, Romania Serbia win the title for the first time as a separate nation, and their fourth title overall.

Athletics
European Championships in Barcelona, Spain.

Golf
Women's majors:
Ricoh Women's British Open in Southport, England:
(1) Yani Tseng 
Tseng wins her second major title of the year, third of her career, and fourth career LPGA Tour title.
Senior majors:
U.S. Senior Open in Sammamish, Washington, United States: (USA unless stated)
(1) Bernhard Langer 
Langer wins his second senior major in as many weeks, and twelfth career Champions Tour title.
PGA Tour:
Greenbrier Classic in White Sulphur Springs, West Virginia:
Winner: Stuart Appleby 
Appleby wins his ninth PGA Tour title, as he shoots a final round 59; the fifth such round in Tour history and second this season.
European Tour:
Irish Open in Killarney, Ireland:
Winner: Ross Fisher 
Fisher wins his fourth European Tour title.

Extreme sport
X Games XVI in Los Angeles, California.

References

VIII